Athena Teaches the Young Man How to Use a Weapon (German: Athena unterrichtet den Jungen im Waffengebrauch) is an 1853 sculpture by Hermann Schievelbein, installed on Schlossbrücke in Berlin, Germany.

See also

 1853 in art
 Greek mythology in popular culture

References

External links
 

1853 establishments in Germany
1853 sculptures
Ancient Greece in art and culture
Outdoor sculptures in Berlin
Sculptures of men in Germany
Sculptures of Athena
Statues in Germany